The MacDonald House is a prominent building and monument in Singapore, located at Orchard Road in the Museum Planning Area, within the Central Area of the country. Built in 1949, it was the first building to be fully air-conditioned in Southeast Asia. Located a short distance from the Istana, it was the last remaining office building in facing brick in the central area.

Initially built mostly as a bank, it continues to function as a banking hall (albeit for a different bank) today with various other companies, although it is better known as the historic site of a bombing attack in 1965 at the height of Indonesia–Malaysia confrontation (Konfrontasi). It was designated as a national monument of Singapore in 2003.

History
The building was built in 1949, and designed by Reginal Eyre of the architectural firm Palmer and Turner. It was named after Malcolm MacDonald, the then Governor-General of Malaya. One of the first high-rise buildings in Orchard Road, the MacDonald House housed mainly British, American and Australian companies. It also house EMI's recording studios, used by local bands during the 'pop yeh-yeh' period. Before the building was vacated in the early 2000s, the building housed HSBC on the first few floors of the building.

In an incident known as the MacDonald House bombing, three Indonesian saboteurs placed a bomb on the mezzanine floor on 10 March 1965, killing three and wounding 33. This was one of a number of terrorist attacks in Singapore during the Indonesian Confrontation in support of President Sukarno's opposition to the merger of Singapore, Malaya, Sabah and Sarawak to form the Federation of Malaysia. At the time of the bombing, the building also housed the Australian High Commission and the Japanese Consulate.

While the sale was on-going, the building was gazetted as a national monument on 10 February 2003, with the exterior façade coming under protection. The successful bidder, Tinifia Investment, paid S$36 million for the freehold building in 2003, and closed the building for extensive interior renovations costing another S$12 million, including the upgrading of the ceilings, floors, lobby and lifts, and the introduction of car parking facilities with the addition of a mechanical parking system for 30 cars.

The building re-opened in April 2005 with full occupancy. McCann Worldgroup occupies the fifth to eighth floors while a beauty/spa operator, Expressions International, takes up the top two floors. The flagship Orchard Road Branch of Citibank Singapore opened on 23 June 2005, occupying  of space spread over the building's lower four floors which house the largest wealth management centre in Asia.

Architecture
Palmer and Turner arrived in Singapore in 1940 from Shanghai via Hong Kong. The firm was established by Colonel P.O.G. Wakeham in Singapore shortly after World War II. It was probably the longest established and one of the best known architectural firms in Southeast Asia, having been formed in Shanghai circa 1882.

The MacDonald House is one of Palmer and Turner's first buildings in Singapore, and was built for The Hongkong and Shanghai Banking Corporation. It was the first large office building of the post-war period.

The building was built in a Neo-Georgian style. It is a reinforced concrete framed structure and clad in light red brickwork of fine detail, the last major building of its kind in downtown Singapore. It was the first building to be fully air-conditioned in Southeast Asia. In addition to the ground banking hall, seven floors of staff flats occupied the building. An open well runs through the building, allowing natural light into the inner offices. There are six skylights in the ceiling of the banking hall which thus needs no artificial lighting during the day.

Bibliography

National Heritage Board (2002), Singapore's 100 Historic Places, Archipelago Press, 
Norman Edwards and Peter Keys (1996), Singapore – A Guide to Buildings, Streets and Places, Times Books International, 
Rashiwala, Kalpana Khattar Wong to move into MacDonald House: sources The Business Times 24 February 2005

References

External links
Journey to Singapore's Yesteryears – MacDonald House

National monuments of Singapore
Commercial buildings completed in 1949
Orchard Road
Museum Planning Area
HSBC buildings and structures
20th-century architecture in Singapore